The Islamic Monthly (TIM) is an online magazine published in the United States. The magazine was first published in 2011. Established by Amina Chaudary, it is self-defined as an independent, nonreligious publication that fosters discussion on a broad range of issues and concerns related to Muslims in the modern world. It was published in print during 2011 and became an online publication from 2012. Among its contributors are Amanda Figueras, a journalist for El Mundo.

References

External links

2011 establishments in Massachusetts
2012 disestablishments in Massachusetts
News magazines published in the United States
Online magazines published in the United States
Religious magazines published in the United States
Defunct magazines published in the United States
Independent magazines
Islamic studies
Magazines established in 2011
Magazines disestablished in 2012
Magazines published in Boston
Online magazines with defunct print editions